Kelbata is a Maronite and Sunni Muslim village in Koura District of Lebanon.

Populated places in the North Governorate
Koura District
Maronite Christian communities in Lebanon
Sunni Muslim communities in Lebanon